The Milwaukee Symphony Chorus is the choral ensemble of the Milwaukee Symphony Orchestra. Founded in 1976 by Margaret Hawkins at the request of then-MSO music director Kenneth Schermerhorn, it was originally called the Wisconsin Conservatory Symphony Chorus and filled a need for the MSO to have a chorus of consistent quality.  It became the Milwaukee Symphony Chorus in 1985, upon coming under the auspices of the MSO.

The chorus consists of some 150 auditioned voices from various backgrounds, with certain members making up a specially-auditioned professional core along with a small number of alternate core members.  Chorus auditions are held in June and August for the fall semester, and in early January for the spring semester.  Following the death of Hawkins in 1993, the chorus director had been her protégé, Lee Erickson, who held the Margaret Hawkins Chorus Director Chair, funded in honor of Hawkins during the Chorus' 30th anniversary year in 2006. Erickson retired from the position following the 2015-2016 season. In May 2017, the Milwaukee Symphony named Dr. Cheryl Frazes Hill, associate conductor of the Chicago Symphony Chorus, the new director of the chorus, who began her tenure during the 2017-2018 season. The assistant director is Timothy J. Benson.

The Milwaukee Symphony Chorus has performed with the Milwaukee Ballet, the Milwaukee Children's Choir, the Milwaukee Chamber Orchestra, and the Chicago Symphony Orchestra at the Ravinia Festival. The chorus has worked with world-renowned conductors such as Helmuth Rilling, Nicholas McGegan, Grant Llewellyn, James Conlon, Christopher Seaman, Andreas Delfs, and Doc Severinsen, as well as former MSO music director Edo de Waart and MSO principal Pops conductor Marvin Hamlisch. Christoph Eschenbach, after leading the Chicago Symphony and the MSC in a Ravinia performance in 2002, pronounced the Milwaukee Symphony Chorus "world-class".

Chorus directors
Margaret Hawkins (1976–1993)
Lee Erickson (1994–2016)
Dr. Cheryl Frazes Hill (2017-)

References

External links 
 Milwaukee Symphony Chorus' official web page at www.mso.org

Musical groups from Wisconsin
Culture of Milwaukee